John Tatum (1772–1858) was a British scientist and philosopher and a London silversmith by trade. He was the founder, in 1808, of the City Philosophical Society where Michael Faraday and other scientists received inspiration.

Also did many lectures.

1772 births
1858 deaths
English scientists
English silversmiths